Dioscorea mexicana, Mexican yam or cabeza de negro is a species of yam in the  genus Dioscorea.

The caudex of D. mexicana is divided into regular polygonal plates that become protuberant with age, and separated by deep fissures. The vigorous  annual vines which may reach 30 feet (9 m) long before dying back in winter, that grow up from the caudex, bear heart-shaped leaves.

Dioscorea mexicana ranges from the state of San Luis Potosí in northeastern Mexico south to Panama.  It is notable for its production of diosgenin, which is a precursor for the synthesis of hormones such as progesterone. Russell Marker developed the extraction and manufacture of hormones from D. mexicana at Syntex. Later the Mexican barbasco trade focused instead on Dioscorea composita instead, as this variety has a higher diosgenin content.

References

External links

mexicana
Flora of Central America
Flora of Mexico
Plants described in 1837
Caudiciform plants